Bank Holiday (also known as Three on a Weekend) is a 1938 British drama film directed by Carol Reed and starring John Lodge, Margaret Lockwood, Hugh Williams and Kathleen Harrison.

Plot 
On a 1930s bank holiday weekend, a number of people rush for trains to head to the seaside. They include:
an unmarried couple, nurse Catherine Lawrence and her boyfriend Geoffrey. Catherine is distracted by thoughts of Stephen Howard, widower of a patient who died in childbirth;
May and Arthur and their working-class family;
two female friends, Doreen and Milly, looking for romance.

Cast
 John Lodge as Stephen Howard
 Margaret Lockwood as Catherine Lawrence
 Hugh Williams as Geoffrey
 Rene Ray as Doreen Richards
 Merle Tottenham as Milly
 Linden Travers as Ann Howard
 Wally Patch as Arthur
 Kathleen Harrison as May
 Garry Marsh as 'Follies' manager
 Jeanne Stuart as Miss Mayfair
 Wilfrid Lawson as Police sergeant
 Felix Aylmer as Surgeon
 Leonard Sharp as Jack, the petrol pump attendant
 Michael Rennie as Guardsman (uncredited)

Production
It was the third collaboration between Reed and Lockwood.
Actor Michael Rennie appeared (uncredited) as a Guardsman in the film.

Reception
The film was popular and helped establish Carol Reed's reputation.

The Sunday Express called it "'one of the ablest pieces of picture-making to come out of a British studio."

Lockwood was voted third best actress of 1938 by the readers of Film Weekly.

References

External links

Bank Holiday at BFI Screenonline
Bank Holiday at Britmovie
Review of film at Variety

1938 films
1938 drama films
British drama films
British black-and-white films
Films about vacationing
Films directed by Carol Reed
Films set in Brighton and Hove
Gainsborough Pictures films
1930s English-language films
1930s British films